The Federal Retirement Thrift Investment Board is an independent agency of the United States government by the Federal Employees Retirement System Act of 1986. It has roughly 270 employees. It was established to administer the Thrift Savings Plan, which is a retirement savings and investment plan for federal employees and members of the uniformed services, including the Ready Reserve. The Thrift Savings Plan is a tax-deferred defined contribution plan similar to a private sector 401(k) plan. The Thrift Savings Plan is one of the three parts of the Federal Employees Retirement System, and is the largest defined contribution plan in the world. As of August 2021, the board manages $794.7 billion in assets on behalf of 6.4 million participants. The board members and its chairman are nominated by the president and confirmed by the United States Senate.

Governance 
Governance of the agency is carried out by a five-person, part-time board of presidential appointees and by a full-time executive director selected by those appointees.  Of the five appointees, three members are appointed solely by the President without other consideration (of whom one shall be nominated as chairman), one member is appointed after considering the recommendation of the Speaker of the House (in consultation with the House Minority Leader) and the fifth member is appointed after considering the recommendation of the Senate Majority Leader (in consultation with the Senate Minority Leader).  Each of these persons is required by FERSA to have "substantial experience, training, and expertise in the management of financial investments and pension benefit plans." 5 U.S.C. 8472(d). The board members collectively establish the policies under which the TSP operates and furnish general oversight. The executive director carries out the policies established by the board members and otherwise acts as the full-time chief executive of the agency. The board and the executive director convene monthly in meetings open to the public to review policies, practices, and performance.

The chairman also appoints a 15-member Employee Thrift Advisory Council to provide input from the various employee, servicemember, and annuitant groups who have TSP investments, of which one is designated by the chairman as the council head.  The 15-member board is made up of the following:
Four members representing the four largest non-Postal employee unions
Two members representing the two largest Postal employee unions, excluding rural letter carrier unions
One member representing the largest Postal employee union representing rural letter carriers
Two members representing the two largest groups representing Postal managerial personnel
One member representing Postal supervisors
One member representing the interests of women in Federal civil service
One member representing the largest group of individuals receiving annuities
One member representing the largest group representing supervisors and managerial personnel, excluding Senior Executive Service
One member representing the Senior Executive Service
One member representing the uniformed services

The first chairman of the board was Roger W. Mehle, who was appointed on October 1, 1986. In 1988 he was reappointed and served continuously until January 31, 1994. President Clinton appointed James H. Atkins to replace him, and the board named Mehle the agency's executive director. Clinton named Atkins to another term in 1997, and to a third term via a recess appointment in 2000. He was succeeded by Andrew Saul, who named Gary Amelio executive director in 2002, replacing Mehle. The current executive director is Ravindra Deo, who succeeded Gregory Long in 2017. Ravindra Deo joined the FRTIB in 2015 as the Chief Investment Officer and additionally served as Acting Chief Operating Officer and Acting Executive Director during his tenure.

Investments in unaudited companies in China 
The Federal Retirement Thrift Investment Board has been criticized for a 2017 decision to mirror an index that invests in unaudited Chinese companies as well as companies that are sanctioned by the U.S. Despite scrutiny from the U.S. Senate, Board voted to permit continued investment in an index containing stocks of unaudited companies in the People's Republic of China. In November 2019, U.S. senators Marco Rubio and Jeanne Shaheen introduced legislation, the Taxpayers and Savers Protection Act, to force the Board to divest from unaudited Chinese companies. In May 2020, a directive from the United States Department of Labor ordered the TSP to halt a plan to invest in Chinese stocks. In 2022, a coalition was formed to push for the removal of emerging-market funds that contain companies linked to the People's Liberation Army.

See also
Title 5 of the Code of Federal Regulations
List of members of the Federal Retirement Thrift Investment Board

References

External links

 
Retirement Thrift Investment Board
Retirement in the United States
Public pension funds in the United States
Government agencies established in 1986
Government-owned companies of the United States
1986 establishments in the United States